Shaushtatar (also spelled Šauštatar) was a king of the Hurrian kingdom of Mitanni in the fifteenth century BC. Two tablets of Shaushtatar (AIT 13 and AIT 14), legal decisions, were found at Alalakh. They mention Niqmepa, the king of Alalakh, providing a synchronism. A tablet of Shaushtatar was found at Tall Bazi, granting land.

Invasion of Assyria 
Shaushtatar was the son of Parshatatar. By the time he ascended the throne ca. the 15th century BC, his father had installed Hurrian client kings in a number of cities, making it easier for Shaushtatar to make Mittani a Mesopotamian power. Now freed from the constant threat undergone by Mitanni of the Egyptians, Shaushtatar turned his attention toward Assyria. He invaded Assyria and sacked and looted its capital, Assur.

Later Battles 
After his invasion of Assyria, Shaushtatar turned his army westward across the Euphrates, along the way gathering beneath his sway all the northern Syrian states as he brought his army to the Mediterranean coast. He succeeded in extending the boundaries of Mitanni to include the areas of Alalakh, Nuzi, Assur, and Kizzuwatna. He was looking to extend Mitanni's power further south, perhaps into Palestine. However, much of southern Syria still lay within the Egyptian sphere of influence, which had long been a threat to Mitanni.

There was a consequence into Shaushtatar's expansion into Palestine: war with Egypt. Despite Mitanni's advantage that Palestine had a significant Hurrian population at the time, the war would be difficult to win. During the planning stages, however, Shaushtatar died, and his son Artatama I would negotiate with the pharaoh Amenhotep II over an alliance.

References

Hurrian kings
15th-century BC people